The Aircraft Technologies Acro 1 is an American aerobatic homebuilt aircraft that was designed by Fred Meyer and produced by Aircraft Technologies of Lilburn, Georgia. When it was available the aircraft was supplied as a kit or in the form of plans for amateur construction. Neither plans nor kits are available anymore and the aircraft is out of production.

Design and development
Designed as a high-speed, long-range cross country and aerobatic aircraft, the Acro 1 features a cantilever low-wing, a single-seat enclosed cockpit under a bubble canopy, fixed conventional landing gear and a single engine in tractor configuration. The aircraft is stressed to +/-15g.

The aircraft is made from graphite and fiberglass composites.

The manufacturer estimates the construction time from the supplied kit as 700 hours.

Operational history
By 1998 the company reported that one example had been flown.

In November 2014 three examples were registered in the United States with the Federal Aviation Administration.

Specifications (Acro 1)

See also

References

External links
Photo of an Acro 1

Acro 001
1990s United States sport aircraft
Single-engined tractor aircraft
Low-wing aircraft
Homebuilt aircraft
Aerobatic aircraft